Shirley Chung is a Chinese-American chef know for appearances on Top Chef: New Orleans, Top Chef: Charleston and season 3 of the Food Network's Tournament of Champions.

Early life and education
Chung was born in Beijing, China and immigrated to the United States with her family when she was 17 years old. She was introduced to international cuisine as a child by her grandmother Liang Si Yi, who worked as a director for the Red Cross. Chung worked for several years in Silicon Valley, after graduating with a degree in business administration. She eventually left the tech industry to attend culinary school.

Career
Trained in classic French and Italian cuisine, Chung has since worked and opened restaurants for chefs including José Andrés, Thomas Keller and Guy Savoy. In 2014 she opened Twenty Eight with Stacie Tran, acting as partner chef at the Irvine, California restaurant.

Chung's opened her first restaurant, Ms. Chi Cafe, in Culver City in 2018. She spoke openly about her experiences with anti-Asian racism following the onset of the COVID-19 in order to draw attention to impact of hate motivated behaviour on the businesses owned by Asian Pacific Americans.

In addition to working in restaurants, Chung has appeared on numerous cooking related television shows. She first appeared as a contestant on Top Chef Season 11, where she finished in third place. She returned to the show during Season 14, competing against winner Brooke Williamson in the finals. The pair previously competed against each other as part of Top Chef Duels, where Chung bested Williamson. In 2022, she joined the cast of the Food Network's Tournament of Champions hosted by Guy Fieri.

Appeared in an episode of mythical kitchen where she ate a 3-course meal using Pringles.

Publications

References

Living people
Top Chef contestants
American people of Chinese descent
Women chefs
Women restaurateurs
Women television personalities
Chinese emigrants to the United States
People from Beijing
Year of birth missing (living people)